Shaquelle "Shaq" Evans (born March 7, 1991) is an American football wide receiver for the Ottawa Redblacks of the Canadian Football League (CFL). He was drafted by the New York Jets in the fourth round of the 2014 NFL Draft. He played college football at UCLA. Evans has also been a member of the Jacksonville Jaguars, New England Patriots, Dallas Cowboys and Saskatchewan Roughriders.

Early years
Evans was selected and participated in the Hawaii Prep Football Classic. He played in the U.S. Army All-American game. He was selected to SuperPrep All-America team in high school. He was named to the Western 100 by the Tacoma News-Tribune in high school. He was selected to the all-state third team by CalHiSports.com following his senior year in high school.

College career

Evans originally attended Notre Dame, but decided to transfer to UCLA due to the proximity to home. Evans was on the watchlist for the Fred Biletnikoff Award prior to his senior year. He was an all-conference honorable mention that season, helping the Bruins to a 10 win season.

Professional career

New York Jets
On May 10, 2014, he was drafted by the New York Jets in the fourth round, 115 overall of the 2014 NFL Draft. He signed a 4-year, $2.67 million contract on May 15, 2014. Before he could appear in an NFL game, Evans was placed on injured reserve on August 19, 2014, with a shoulder injury.

On September 5, 2015, the Jets waived Evans.

Jacksonville Jaguars
Evans was signed to the Jacksonville Jaguars practice squad on September 29, 2015. On September 3, 2016, he was released by the Jaguars. He was signed to the Jaguars' practice squad the next day. He was released on September 13.

New England Patriots
Evans was signed to the New England Patriots' practice squad on October 12, 2016. On October 20, 2016, the Patriots released Evans from their practice squad.

Dallas Cowboys
On January 4, 2017, Evans was signed to the Dallas Cowboys' practice squad. He signed a reserve/future contract with the Cowboys on January 16, 2017.

On April 21, 2017, Evans was suspended the first four games of the 2017 season for violating the league's drug policy. On April 27, 2017, Evans was waived by the Cowboys.

Saskatchewan Roughriders
On February 22, 2018, Evans signed with the Saskatchewan Roughriders. He played in 17 regular season games in 2018 where he had 50 receptions for 785 yards. In 2019, Evans had 72 receptions and 1334 receiving yards and scored five touchdowns en route to being named a CFL All-Star. He signed a one-year contract extension with the team on December 24, 2020. In his third season with the club Evans played in seven games, catching 25 passes for 244 yards. On January 18, 2022, Evans and the Riders agreed to a contract extension. Evans was forced out of the Roughriders third game of the 2022 season with an ankle injury. It was later reported he would miss 6–8 weeks with a fractured ankle. At the time he had caught 10 passes for 185 yards. In total Evans missed eight games in 2022, playing in 10 regular season games and catching 32 passes for 487 yards with two touchdowns. In late January 2023, as a pending free agent, Evans told a local radio station that he did not expect to re-sign with the Roughriders.

Ottawa Redblacks 
On February 14, 2023, the first day of free agency, Evans signed a one-year contract with the Ottawa Redblacks.

References

External links

Saskatchewan Roughriders bio
UCLA Bruins bio

1991 births
Living people
American football wide receivers
American players of Canadian football
Canadian football wide receivers
Dallas Cowboys players
Jacksonville Jaguars players
New England Patriots players
New York Jets players
Notre Dame Fighting Irish football players
Saskatchewan Roughriders players
Sportspeople from Inglewood, California
UCLA Bruins football players
Inglewood High School (California) alumni
Players of American football from Inglewood, California